Princess Irmingard of Bavaria (29 May 1923 – 23 October 2010) was the daughter of Rupprecht, Crown Prince of Bavaria and his second wife, Princess Antonia of Luxembourg. She was a half-sister of Albrecht, Duke of Bavaria.

Life

Irmingard was born at her father's residence, Schloss Berchtesgaden. She spent her childhood between Berchtesgaden and her other residences, the Leuchtenberg Palais in Munich, Schloss Leutstetten, and Schloss Hohenschwangau.  In 1936 she was sent to England to be educated at the Convent of the Sacred Heart in Roehampton (later Woldingham School) where several of her cousins, princesses of Luxembourg, were also enrolled.

In early 1940 Irmingard and her siblings were allowed to go to Italy and join their father who had left Germany to avoid conflict with the Nazi authorities. She spent the rest of the war mostly in Rome, Florence, and Padua.

In September 1944, Irmingard was arrested by the Nazis who had been unsuccessful in trying to find and arrest her father.  She fell ill from typhus and was sent to a prison hospital in Innsbruck.  When she recovered, she was sent to the concentration camp at Oranienburg-Sachsenhausen, where she was reunited with other members of her family who had also been arrested.  Later they were transferred to the concentration camps at Flossenbürg and Dachau, before being freed by the Third American Army on 30 April 1945.

Irmingard and her sisters sought refuge in Luxembourg, where their mother's sister Charlotte reigned. After a brief return to Germany, she went to the United States for a year, where her uncle Prince Adolf of Schwarzenberg had a ranch in Montana.

Marriage and children
On 20 July 1950, Irmingard married her first cousin Prince Ludwig of Bavaria (22 June 1913 in Munich — 17 October 2008 in Leutstetten), son of Prince Franz of Bavaria and Princess Isabella Antonie of Croÿ. The civil wedding took place at Leutstetten, and the religious ceremony followed a day later at Schloss Nymphenburg in Munich. The couple had three children, five grandchildren and five great-grandchildren:

 Prince Luitpold of Bavaria (born 14 April 1951 in Leutstetten).
 Princess Maria of Bavaria (born and died 3 January 1953 in Leutstetten)
 Princess Philippa of Bavaria (born and died 26 June 1954 in Leutstetten)

After her father's death in 1955, Irmingard and her husband moved into Schloss Leutstetten, where she continued to live after her husband's death in 2008.

Ancestry

References

External links
 Obituary of Princess Irmingard of Bavaria, The Daily Telegraph, 8 November, 2010

1923 births
2010 deaths
People from Berchtesgaden
Bavarian princesses
House of Wittelsbach
Nobility from Munich
Sachsenhausen concentration camp survivors
Flossenbürg concentration camp survivors
Dachau concentration camp survivors
People educated at Woldingham School
Burials at Andechs Abbey